Slaves Today; A Story of Liberia is a novel written by George Schuyler, an African American. It was published in 1931. Schuyler visited Liberia and based his fictional story on his perspective of labor issues and Americo-Liberian relations with indigenous tribes during the early years of the Great Depression.

A review describes the hero of the story, Zo, as pan-African. The book has been described as the first novel about Africa written by an African American. The same reviewer described it as having a journalistic and anthropological style.

The first edition of the book was published in 1931 by Brewer, Warren and Putnam in New York. A subsequent 1969 edition was published by McGrath Publishing Co. in College Park, Maryland. The book was first published the same year as Schuyler's Black No More.

A 1932 review by Nnamdi Azikiwe, who would become the first president of independent Nigeria, was published in the Journal of African American History and described the book as being historical fiction and stated that forced labor is a function of colonialism and imperialism.

The plot is a love story that ends in tragedy when faced with corrupt bureaucracy.

References

1931 American novels
Books about Liberia
Novels set in Liberia